The 2022 Indian Premier League Final was played on 29 May 2022 at the Narendra Modi Stadium in Ahmedabad. It was a Day/Night Twenty20 match, which decided the winner of the 2022 season of the Indian Premier League (IPL), an annual Twenty20 tournament in India. Gujarat Titans, playing their first tournament, won the match and the title by defeating Rajasthan Royals by seven wickets. Captain of the Titans, Hardik Pandya, was also the player of the match.

Background
On 24 February 2022, the BCCI announced the schedule for the 2022 season of the IPL. Four venues were scheduled to host the group stage. The schedule for the playoffs was announced on 3 May. Eden Gardens in Kolkata was chosen to host qualifier 1 and the eliminator whereas the Narendra Modi Stadium in Ahmedabad was chosen to host the qualifier 2 and the final. Gujarat Titans and Rajasthan Royals played the Final on 29 May 2022.

Road to the Final

Group stage
Gujarat Titans started their season with a 5 wicket win over Lucknow Super Giants at the Wankhede Stadium in Mumbai. They went on a three match winning streak until it was broken by Sunrisers Hyderabad. They went on a five match winning streak after that loss but lost three of their last five matches. They ended the group stage with 10 wins and 4 losses, finishing first in the table.

Rajasthan Royals started their season with a 61 run win over Sunrisers Hyderabad at the Maharashtra Cricket Association Stadium in Pune. Their first loss came against Royal Challengers Bangalore, in their third match. They won five of their first seven matches and four of their next seven matches. They ended the group stage with 9 wins and 5 losses. Although they had the same number of points as Lucknow Super Giants, they finished in the second spot as they had a higher net run rate.

League stage matches between finalists

Gujarat won the only fixture between the two teams by 37 runs on 14 April in Navi Mumbai. Hardik Pandya scored 87* and was the player of the match.

Playoffs
The playoff stage of IPL was played according to the Page playoff system and provided Gujarat and Rajasthan, being the top and second-ranked teams, with two chances for qualifying for the Final. These teams first faced each other in Qualifier 1, with Gujarat, as the winners, qualifying directly for the final; Rajasthan, as the loser of Qualifier 1, played against the winner of the Eliminator in Qualifier 2, with the winner of that match qualifying for the final.

In Qualifier 1, Gujarat won the toss and chose to field. Rajasthan scored 188 in their 20 overs with Jos Buttler top scored for Rajasthan with 89*. Rashid Khan was Gujarat's best bowler, despite not taking a wicket, he bowled four overs at an economy of 3.75. Mohammed Shami, Yash Dayal, R Sai Kishore and Hardik Pandya took a wicket each for Gujarat. In reply, Gujarat chased the total down with three balls to spare. David Miller top scored with 68* and was awarded player of the match. As a result, Gujarat qualified for the final.

The Royal Challengers Bangalore won against Lucknow Super Giants in the Eliminator to set up a match against Rajasthan to decide the second finalist.

In Qualifier 2, Rajasthan won the toss and chose to field. Bangalore scored 157/8 in their 20 overs. Rajat Patidar top scored for them with 58 while Prasidh Krishna was the best bowler for Rajasthan with 3/22. In reply, Rajasthan chased the target in 18.1 overs, with Jos Buttler scoring a century. Rajasthan qualified for their first final since 2008, and their second final overall.

Match

Match officials
Source:
 On-field umpires: Chris Gaffaney and Nitin Menon
 Third umpire: K. N. Ananthapadmanabhan
 Reserve umpire: Anil Chaudhary
 Match referee: Javagal Srinath
 Toss: Rajasthan Royals  the toss and elected to bat.

Summary
Sanju Samson of the Rajasthan Royals won the toss and elected to bat to put the opposition Gujarat Titans to field. Rajasthan Royals scored a total of 130 runs for a loss of 9 wickets in their 20 overs. Chasing 131, the Gujarat Titans scored 133 runs for a loss of 3 wickets in just 18.1 overs, winning the match and the Indian Premier League title in their inaugural tournament. Titans captain Hardik Pandya was the player of the match having taken three wickets while conceding 17 runs in his four overs, and following it with a knock of 34 runs in 30 balls.

Rajasthan Royals innings 
Batting first, the Rajasthan Royals had Indian batsman Yashasvi Jaiswal and England batsman Jos Buttler opened the innings. The two got off to relatively slow start with Jaiswal taking eight deliveries to get off the mark while Butler ended the power play scoring 10 runs from the 14 balls that he faced. Jaiswal was the first to depart when he was dismissed of the last ball of the fourth over, caught at deep square leg by Sai Kishore off the bowling of Yash Dayal having scored 22 runs from 16 balls. Captain Sanju Samson attempted to accelerate the scoring two boundaries off the very first three deliveries before being out caught by Kishore at backward point off the bowling of Hardik Pandya, with the score reading 60 for the loss of two wickets from 8.2 overs. Pandya continued to keep the pressure forcing incoming batsman Devdutt Padikkal to remain scoreless against him across seven deliveries. Padikkal eventually was out to Rashid Khan, caught again at backward point. Butler followed by losing his wicket to Pandya, caught by the wicketkeeper Wriddhiman Saha. Pandya followed it up with the wicket of Shimron Hetmyer, catching off his own bowling, with the West Indian being out for 11 from 12 deliveries. Royals ended their 20 overs scoring 130 runs for the loss of 9 wickets. Pandya was the pick of the bowlers having taken 3 wickets while conceding 17 runs in his four overs. Kishore claimed two wickets in the two overs that he bowled while conceding 20 runs, taking the wickets of Ravichandran Ashwin and Trent Boult.

Gujarat Titans innings 
Indian batsmen Wriddhiman Saha and Shubman Gill opened the innings for the Titans. The pair was broken early in the second over when Saha was out bowled by pacer Prasidh Krishna having scored 5 runs from 7 balls. New Zealand fast bowler Trent followed it up by dismissing Australian batsman Matthew Wade, out caught by Riyan Parag. The score was 23 runs for the loss of two wickets, bringing the captain Pandya to the crease. Pandya and Gill put on a healthy partnership of 63 runs effectively ensuring that Titans were out of a spot of bother. Pandya was out in the 14th over caught by Jaiswal off the bowling of Indian spinner Yuzvendra Chahal. Gill went on to see the team through by scoring 45 runs from 43 balls. South African batsman David Miller chipped in scoring 32 runs from 19 deliveries ensuring that the Titans scored 133 runs for the loss of 3 wickets, winning the match by 7 wickets with 11 deliveries to spare. Pandya was the player of the match.

Scorecard
Source:

Fall of wickets: 31/1 (Y. Jaiswal, 3.6 ov), 60/2 (S. Samson, 8.2 ov), 79/3 (D. Padikkal, 11.5 ov), 79/4 (J. Buttler, 12.1 ov), 94/5 (S. Hetmyer, 14.6 ov), 98/6 (R. Ashwin, 15.5 ov), 112/7 (T. Boult, 17.3 ov), 130/8 (O. McCoy, 19.4 ov), 130//9 (R. Parag, 20 ov)

Fall of wickets: 9/1 (W. Saha, 1.4 ov), 23/2 (M. Wade, 4.3 ov), 86/3 (H. Pandya, 13.2 ov)

References

External links
 Match Centre at IPLT20.com
 Series home at ESPNcricinfo

Final
2022
May 2022 sports events in Asia